Dana Marie Douglas (born 1975) is an American attorney who is a United States circuit judge of the United States Court of Appeals for the Fifth Circuit. She previously served as a United States magistrate judge of the United States District Court for the Eastern District of Louisiana.

Education 
Douglas earned a Bachelor of Arts from Miami University in 1997 and a Juris Doctor from the Loyola University New Orleans College of Law in 2000.

Career 
In 2000 and 2001, Douglas served as a law clerk for Judge Ivan L. R. Lemelle of the United States District Court for the Eastern District of Louisiana. From 2003 to 2013, she was a member of the New Orleans Civil Service Commission. In this role, Douglas authored an opinion affirming the suspension and termination of a police officer for committing a battery against a civilian. In another case, Douglas affirmed disciplinary actions against officers who formed a limited liability company to administer their paid off-duty police details.

She was also a partner for 17 years at the New Orleans office of Liskow & Lewis, a Louisiana law firm focused on energy and oil industries. Douglas has presided over discovery disputes. Douglas denied an effort by Amtrak to subpoena medical records from an employee, finding portions of the subpoena to be unnecessary. 

Douglas is a former president of both the New Orleans Bar Association and the Greater New Orleans Louis A. Martinet Society. Douglas volunteered in legal clinics and was involved in several local and state legal groups.

Federal judicial service

United States Magistrate Judge service 

Douglas joined the United States District Court for the Eastern District of Louisiana as a magistrate judge on January 6, 2019.

Court of appeals service 

On June 15, 2022, President Joe Biden nominated Douglas to serve as United States Circuit Court Judge of the United States Court of Appeals for the Fifth Circuit. President Biden nominated Douglas to the seat vacated by Judge James L. Dennis, who assumed senior status upon confirmation of a successor. On July 27, 2022, a hearing on her nomination was held before the Senate Judiciary Committee. On September 15, 2022, her nomination was reported out of committee by a 16–6 vote. On December 8, 2022, the United States Senate invoked cloture on her nomination by a 63–31 vote. On December 13, 2022, her nomination was confirmed by a 65–31 vote. She received her judicial commission on December 16, 2022. She is the first woman of color to serve on the United States Court of Appeals for the Fifth Circuit.

See also 
 List of African-American federal judges
 List of African-American jurists

References

External links 

1975 births
Living people
20th-century American women lawyers
20th-century American lawyers
21st-century American women judges
21st-century American judges
21st-century American women lawyers
21st-century American lawyers
African-American judges
African-American lawyers
African-American women lawyers
Judges of the United States Court of Appeals for the Fifth Circuit
Lawyers from New Orleans
Louisiana lawyers
Loyola University New Orleans College of Law alumni
Miami University alumni
United States court of appeals judges appointed by Joe Biden
United States magistrate judges